Kakkur  is a village in Kozhikode district in the state of Kerala, India.It is blessed by nature with hills and rivers.  Pokkunnu is a small  hill situated in northern Kakkur.

Demographics
 India census, Kakkur had a population of 21057 with 10170 males and 10887 females.

References

Villages in Kozhikode district
Kozhikode north